Simon Francis Forde (born 22 January 1972) is a New Zealand former cricketer. He played ten first-class and twenty List A matches for Otago between 1998 and 2001.

Forde was born at Tuatapere in Southland in 1972. He worked as a police officer and was awarded a bronze medal for bravery by the Royal Humane Society after attempting to extinguish a fire with two colleagues and searched a burning building for injured survivors. Since retiring from playing cricket he has been a selector for the Otago side.

References

External links
 

1972 births
Living people
New Zealand cricketers
Otago cricketers
People from Tuatapere